Sulo Aittoniemi (11 July 1936 – 16 June 2016) was a Finnish politician who was an MP between 1987 and 2003.

References

1936 births
2016 deaths
People from Ikaalinen
Finnish Rural Party politicians
Centre Party (Finland) politicians
Members of the Parliament of Finland (1987–91)
Members of the Parliament of Finland (1991–95)
Members of the Parliament of Finland (1995–99)
Members of the Parliament of Finland (1999–2003)
Candidates for President of Finland